1999–2000 Croatian First A League was the ninth season of the Croatian handball league since its independence.

League tables and results

First Phase

Championship play-offs

Relegation play-offs

Sources 
 Fredi Kramer, Dražen Pinević: Hrvatski rukomet = Croatian handball, Zagreb, 2009.; page 179
 Petar Orgulić: 50 godina rukometa u Rijeci, Rijeka, 2005; pages 268, 269

References

External links
Croatian Handball Federation
European Handball Federation
History

1999-00
handball
handball
Croatia